Presidential elections were scheduled to be held in Iceland in 1960. However, incumbent President Ásgeir Ásgeirsson was the only candidate, and the election was uncontested.

References

Presidential elections in Iceland
Presidential election
Iceland
Uncontested elections